Akhmat Tower is a supertall skyscraper undergoing ground preparations in Grozny, Chechen Republic of Russia. Construction started on 2 January 2016, and as of September 2016, the piling work was completed. It was scheduled for completion in 2020, however was still incomplete as of May 2022.  

Akhmat Tower is named after former first President of the Chechen Republic, Akhmad Kadyrov.  

The building is planned to be , and have 100 floors. The design of the building is heavily influenced by Vainakh tower architecture – it is modeled after the military towers. The building will incorporate offices, apartments, a 5 star hotel, parking, a museum, and public spaces.

See also
 Lakhta Center
 Mercury City Tower
 Imperia Tower
 Eurasia (building)
 Moscow International Business Center
 List of tallest buildings in Russia
 List of tallest buildings in Europe
 List of buildings with 100 floors or more

References

Buildings and structures in Grozny
Proposed buildings and structures in Russia
Proposed skyscrapers